The Second Deakin government refers to the period of federal executive government of Australia led by Prime Minister Alfred Deakin. It lasted from 5 July 1905 to 13 November 1908. Deakin was the second prime minister of Australia, having previously led the Deakin government (1903–1904), and held the office again in 1909–1910.

Alfred Deakin

Alfred Deakin (1856–1919) – a barrister, journalist and important Federation era politician – was born in Melbourne in 1856. He first entered the Victorian Parliament as a Liberal in 1879. He attended all the official Federal conferences and conventions working towards federation of Britain's Australian colonies, and was skilled at brokering compromises. He played a significant part in shaping the Australian Constitution, and arguing the case for unity of the colonies.

Deakin was a fine orator and major player in the establishment of the institutions of Australian Democracy, and served three times in the office of Prime Minister during the first ten years of Australia's Federation.

Background

Alfred Deakin first became prime minister after Edmund Barton resigned to become a judge on the first High Court of Australia. The first Deakin government failed to pass any legislation in the newly formed Australian Federal Parliament. The Protectionists' shaky coalition with the Australian Labor Party did not long survive the December 1903 election, and by the resumption of Parliament in March 1904, the Deakin government had fallen, amid a dispute over a Labor Party amendment to the Conciliation and Arbitration Bill.

The early years of Federation saw a volatile political environment. The first Deakin government ended on 27 April 1904, making way for the first Australian Labor Party government of Australia, led by Chris Watson. In August that year, the Protectionists split with radical liberals, Isaac Isaacs and William Lyne, aligning with the Labor Party against the Free Trade Party of George Reid.

The Reid government lasted from 18 August 1904 – 5 July 1905. Reid denounced the Labour Party as the "Socialist tiger". Watson encouraged Alfred Deakin to abandon the Free Traders, saying: "We, and especially me, don't want office, but I have the utmost anxiety to stop the retrogressive movement which Reid is heading." Deakin commenced his second term as Prime Minister in July 1905, with Labour's support

In Office

Papua Act 1905 – formal acceptance of administration of British New Guinea and establishment of Territory of Papua
Judiciary Act 1906 – addition of two additional judges to the High Court
1906 Australian Senate elections referendum (passed in every state and with 82.65% nationwide)
Quarantine Act 1908

Aftermath

See also

History of Australia
History of Australia (1901–45)

References

Deakin II